Upper Kedron is a outer north-western suburb in the City of Brisbane, Queensland, Australia.

Geography 
Upper Kedron is a residential suburb on the edge of the Brisbane Forest Park.

The suburb contains the headwaters of the two tributaries of Kedron Brook, namely Kedron Creek and Cedar Creek.

History 
Upper Kedron Hall opened on Cedar Creek Road in 1890.

The Cedar Creek Cemetery opened on Cemetery Road in 1898.

The median age of the Upper Kedron population was 31 years, 6 years below the Australian median. 81.3% of people living in Upper Kedron were born in Australia, compared to the national average of 69.8%; the next most common countries of birth were England 5.5%, New Zealand 3%, Scotland 0.6%, South Africa 0.6%, Iran 0.4%. 92.5% of people spoke only English at home; the next most common languages were 0.7% Persian (excluding Dari), 0.4% Italian, 0.3% Assyrian Neo-Aramaic, 0.3% Dutch, 0.3% Sinhalese.

In 2014, Cedar Woods Properties purchased a  parcel of land remaining within Upper Kedron for $68 million. Cedar Woods received council approval to develop this into a 900-lot master planned residential community.

Development

Cedar Woods lodged a Development Application with Brisbane City Council over the Suburb's remaining undeveloped land within the South East Queensland Urban Footprint, noting the council's zones as being inconsistent with the South East Queensland Regional Plan. The development proposes to use an existing road reserve which runs through the property to connect with Mount Nebo Road, and ultimately Waterworks Road.

The proposed 227 hectare development includes 91 hectares of open space and up to 980 individual lots to be developed over a period of ten years. The works to develop the site are estimated to cost $900 million, and will generate up to 550 direct jobs.

The proposed development responds to the site's topography by offering a range of living options, ranging from bush blocks, to lots designed for terrace-style dwellings.

Education 
There are no schools in Upper Kedron. The nearest primary and secondary schools are in neighbouring Ferny Grove.

References

External links

 
 ourbrisbane.com website, Upper Kedron section
 Upper Kedron Estate pre-development website
 Cedar Creek cemetery at Upper Kedron

Suburbs of the City of Brisbane